Richard Jay Tubb (born July 21, 1959) was the personal physician to President George W. Bush as well as being personal physician to Vice President Al Gore during the Clinton Administration. He was a brigadier general in the United States Air Force. His predecessor as White House Physician was Eleanor Mariano; Navy Captain Jeffrey Kuhlman succeeded him as Physician to the President.

Tubb may be the longest serving White House Physician in U.S. history. He was assigned to the White House Medical Unit for nearly 14 years and served in three presidential administrations from 1995 until 2009. As White House Physician, he was a Deputy Assistant to the President and Director of the White House Medical Unit, a component of the White House Military Office, that is part of the Executive Office of the President.

On January 28, 2013, Tubb was appointed a Non-Executive Director of British American Tobacco p.l.c.

References

http://www.ama-assn.org/amednews/2009/03/23/prsa0323.htm

1959 births
Living people
University of Wisconsin School of Medicine and Public Health alumni
United States Air Force generals
People from Viroqua, Wisconsin
Physicians to the President
United States Air Force Academy alumni
Military personnel from Wisconsin
United States Air Force Medical Corps officers